Martin Lukov (born 5 July 1993) is a Bulgarian professional footballer who plays as a goalkeeper for Cypriot club Karmiotissa.

Career

Dunav Ruse
Lukov joined Dunav Ruse in the summer of 2015, while the team was competing in the second division. He became a first choice goalkeeper immediately and played a crucial role during the season, as his team won the league and were promoted to the Bulgarian First League for the first time after a twenty-five year absence.

After the very first fixtures of the 2016-17 season, Lukov contributed heavily under the goalpost for Dunav's surprising five wins and two draws in the first seven rounds. In the match against Beroe Stara Zagora on 18 September 2016, he became Dunav's goalkeeper with the most minutes without conceding a goal, with 456 minutes, a record previously held by Ivan Ivanov during the club's tenure in the 1963-64 A Group season.

On 13 April 2017 it was confirmed that Lukov had sustained a serious injury and would be out of action for at least 6 months, thus missing the remainder of the 2016-17 season. On 13 October 2017 it was announced that Lukov will rejoin the team trainings, being completely ready to return to action. Lukov left the club in June 2018.

Lokomotiv Plovdiv
On 12 June 2018, Lukov signed with Lokomotiv Plovdiv for three years.

International career
In 2013 Lukov played for the Bulgarian Amateur national team - South-East Bulgaria, in the UEFA Regions' Cup.

In the beginning of 2017 he received a call up for Bulgaria, but didn't join the team due to injury. Lukov earned his first cap on 11 October 2020, in the 0–2 away loss against Finland in a UEFA Nations League match.

Career statistics

Club

Honours

Club 
Lokomotiv Plovdiv
Bulgarian Cup (2): 2018–19, 2019–20
Bulgarian Supercup: 2020

References

External links

1993 births
Living people
Footballers from Sofia
Bulgarian footballers
Bulgarian expatriate footballers
Bulgaria international footballers
First Professional Football League (Bulgaria) players
Second Professional Football League (Bulgaria) players
Saudi Professional League players
FC Vitosha Bistritsa players
FC Pirin Razlog players
FC Oborishte players
FC Dunav Ruse players
PFC Lokomotiv Plovdiv players
Al-Tai FC players
FC Arda Kardzhali players
Association football goalkeepers
Expatriate footballers in Saudi Arabia
Bulgarian expatriate sportspeople in Saudi Arabia